Benedetto Carrara (born 4 November 1955) is an Italian cross-country skier. He competed in the men's 30 kilometre event at the 1980 Winter Olympics.

References

External links
 

1955 births
Living people
Italian male cross-country skiers
Olympic cross-country skiers of Italy
Cross-country skiers at the 1980 Winter Olympics
Sportspeople from the Province of Bergamo